Events from the year 2022 in Moldova.

Incumbents

Events
 24 February – Moldova declares a state of emergency in response to the 2022 Russian invasion of Ukraine. Hundreds of Ukrainians are crossing the border, according to President Maia Sandu. The country also closes its airspace to commercial aircraft.
 25 February – following the start of the Russian invasion of Ukraine, the Moldovan chemical tanker  is shelled by the Russian military while navigating through the Black Sea.
 3 March – Moldova officially applies to joining the European Union (EU). This is not well-received in Transnistria, a breakaway unrecognized state internationally recognized as part of Moldova, which demands its recognition as an independent state.
 26 April – 2022 Transnistria attacks: Moldova's Supreme Security Council convenes an emergency meeting after yesterday's attacks in the breakaway Transnistria. President Maia Sandu says that the attacks were aimed at "destabilizing the situation in the region", and also says that the military will improve combat readiness and increase patrols on the border with Transnistria.
 1 May – Ukrainian intelligence officials report that Russia is poised to launch a second front from the breakaway area of Transnistria in order to take over the rest of Moldova.
 24 May – Former President of Moldova Igor Dodon is arrested on charges including corruption and treason.
 23 June – The European Union formally awards official candidate status to Ukraine and Moldova.
 15 July – TUMnanoSAT, the first Moldovan satellite, built by the Technical University of Moldova, is launched into space.
 9 August – Russia bans the import of agricultural products from Moldova from August 15 due to "repeated detection of dangerous quarantine objects in Moldovan products entering Russia".
 10 October – Moldova confirms that Russian Navy warships in the Black Sea fired cruise missiles through its airspace to strike targets inside Ukraine. The Russian ambassador is subsequently summoned by Moldovan authorities to explain the violation. 
 12 October – Moldova urges its citizens to decrease the use of electricity after Ukraine halted exports due to Russian missile attacks hit critical infrastructure of the country.
 31 October – Russia launches another wave of missile attacks over Ukraine, and a missile falls within Moldovan territory, in the village of Naslavcea.
 5 December – Due to another wave of Russian missile strikes against Ukraine, a missile again falls within Moldova, close to the city of Briceni.

Deaths 

 2 January – Ion Niculiță, 82, archaeologist
 16 January – Andrei Mudrea, 67, artist
 25 January – Svetlana Căpățînă, 52, politician
 4 July – Elena Bodnarenco, 57, politician
 22 July – Aleksey Vdovin, 59, Olympic water polo player
 12 August – Ion Solonenco, 87, army general
 30 August –Ludmila Diacenco-Sulac, 73, musician
 3 September – Yuri Bashkatov, 54, Olympic swimmer
 9 September – Nicolae Bulat, 70, historian

See also
 2022–2023 Moldovan energy crisis
 2022–2023 Moldovan protests

References

 
2020s in Moldova
Years of the 21st century in Moldova
Moldova